Ruth Helen Butterworth  (21 August 1934 – 29 January 2020) was a New Zealand political scientist at the University of Auckland from 1965 until her retirement.

Biography
Born in England, Butterworth studied at the University of Oxford, from where she graduated Master of Arts and, in 1959, DPhil. The title of her doctoral thesis was The structure and organisation of some Catholic lay organisations in Australia and Great Britain: a comparative study with special reference to the function of the organisations as social and political pressure groups.

Butterworth was appointed as a lecturer in political studies at the University of Auckland in 1965. She was a member of the Labour Party and in 1975 she was speculated by media as a likely contender for the Labour Party candidacy for the  electorate following the retirement of Hugh Watt, but did not put herself forward. She also taught African studies and trade unionism. Her teaching influenced students who became leading politicians, including Helen Clark and Phil Goff. She was a regular contributor to Zealandia, writing on topics including nuclear testing, the Vietnam war, and abortion.

Between 1990 and 1991, Butterworth served as president of the Association of University Staff of New Zealand.

In 1993, Butterworth was awarded the New Zealand Suffrage Centennial Medal. In the 2000 Queen's Birthday Honours, she was appointed a Companion of the New Zealand Order of Merit, for services to tertiary education.

Butterworth died in Auckland on 29 January 2020.

References

External links
 Photograph of Butterworth in 1968. Oettli, Max Christian, 1947– :Photographs of New Zealand scenes. Ref: 35mm-101977-F. Alexander Turnbull Library, Wellington.

1934 births
2020 deaths
Alumni of Nuffield College, Oxford
English political scientists
English emigrants to New Zealand
New Zealand political scientists
Academic staff of the University of Auckland
Recipients of the New Zealand Suffrage Centennial Medal 1993
Companions of the New Zealand Order of Merit
New Zealand women academics
Women political scientists
New Zealand Labour Party politicians